= Garbo Zhu =

Chinese-Canadian potter, designer, entrepreneur, and content creator

- Born: Guangzhou, China
- Education: Ryerson University
- Occupations: Potter, designer, entrepreneur, content creator
- Known for: Grumpy Kid Studio

Garbo Zhu is a Chinese-Canadian potter, designer, entrepreneur, and content creator. She runs Grumpy Kid Studio, an online store where Zhu sells her own handmade ceramics.

As of 2023, Zhu runs a TikTok account with almost 850,000 followers. She was also named to TikTok's first annual API Visionary Voices list.

== Early life and education ==
Zhu was born and raised in Guangzhou, China, but moved to Canada at the age of 14.

As a child, Zhu was always interested in handicraft, but her specific interest in 3D design began in high school when she took art classes. Paired with her appreciation for physics, Zhu decided to study architecture in college at Ryerson University.

== Career ==
After college, Zhu worked in the architecture industry for a few years. However, amid lockdown during the COVID-19 pandemic, Zhu was isolated at home, after which she learned how to make pottery as a hobby, starting with air-dry clay. She then created content on Instagram in 2020 and moved to TikTok in 2021.

When her followers requested to buy her pieces, Zhu founded Grumpy Kid Studio, her own online store, and started working with ceramics rather than air-dry clay. The studio's name refers to "Zhu's habit of carving tiny faces on all her pieces." The studio began with Zhu fulfilling orders from her living room while concurrently attending to her day job in architecture, but she soon quit her day job in 2022 to fully pivot into Grumpy Kid Studio with its own space in Montreal and five staff members. As of 2023, the studio sold 400-500 pieces per month.

In 2024, Zhu shared plans for an upcoming jewelry line.

== Personal life ==
Zhu has one son with her French husband, Vincent.
